Fagaalu is a village in central Tutuila Island, American Samoa. It is also known as Fagaalo. It is located on the eastern shore of Pago Pago Harbor, to the south of Pago Pago. American Samoa's lone hospital, Lyndon B. Johnson Tropical Medical Center, is located in Fagaalu. The village is centered around Fagaalu Stream.

Fagaalu has been named one of the best places to surf in American Samoa. It is one of thirteen villages in American Samoa that have been declared Marine Protected Areas.

History
In April 1941, members of the 7th Battalion showed up in villages throughout Tutuila Island. Later that month, the battalion cleared large jungle areas and began on the construction of the Camp Samuel Nicholas in Fagaalu.

Geography
Fagaalu Bay is located between Niuloa Point in the south and Tulutulu Point in the north. The bay is considered a part of "outer Pago Pago Harbor." The main drainage in the Fagaalu watershed is the Fagaalu Stream and its 8 tributaries. The stream is known as Matafao Stream in the drainage's upper reaches near Mount Matafao. Smaller drainages are situated on the southeast and northeast sides of the village. Matafao Stream begins at around the 1,400 ft. contour and continues downslopes to a stream fall. It becomes Fagaalu Stream at around 500 ft. above sea level. It discharges into the Pacific Ocean in Fagaalu Bay. Gobie fish, Mountain bass, and Freshwater eel have been observed in Fagaalu Stream. Fagaalu Bay is a calm bay with a cricket field, boat ramp, and basketball and volleyball courts.

Most of Fagaalu is located at elevations well above potential tsunami elevations, and also set back a considerable distance from the ocean.

In the central parts of Fagaalu is a road turning north to LBJ Hospital and other medical facilities. At the end of this road are the waterfalls Fagaalu Falls. Fagaalu Bay is one of the best snorkeling spots on the island with its coral heads and reef formations, and sea life such as turtles and reef sharks.

Economy

There were 53 commercial business enterprises found in the village as of 2000. Several of these are located along the shoreline road and Dr Jim Turner Rd. Businesses include two bakeries, grocery stores, retail shops, and a laundromat. A quarry operation is located between the 100–125 foot contour at the west end of Fagaalu. It is operated and owned by Samoa Maritime. As of 2000, the Samoa Maritime Quarry generated around 500 cubic yards of reject material per week.

The LBJ Hospital complex consumes seven acres. The location of the hospital is a former marsh which was filled in the early 1960s in order to accommodate the hospital.

LBJ Tropical Medical Center

Lyndon B. Johnson Tropical Medical Center is the only hospital in American Samoa and the only prescription pharmacy on the island. It has been ranked among the best hospitals in the Pacific Ocean. It is home to an emergency room and there are doctors on duty at all hours.

Tourism
Fagaalu is home to Virgin Falls, which is a tourist destination on the island. A 0.6-mile hike past the LBJ Tropical Medical Center leads to a small rock quarry. From there, a trail climbs past a series of waterfalls, known as Virgin Falls. Several of the waterfalls have pools used for swimming.

Fagaalu is home to Le Fale Pule Lodge, which sits high up on a hillside above Matafao Elementary School in Fagaalu. The hotel offers panoramic views of Pago Pago Harbor, and is located 300 feet above sea level. Four of the rooms are in the main house, while there's also a separate cottage with outdoor Jacuzzis.

In 1972, the Bureau of Outdoor Recreation approved a project to develop a park in Fagaalu Bay. Fagaalu Park is located at the outer part of Pago Pago Harbor and is a grassy park with picnic tables and a white-sand beach. A boat ramp has been constructed at Fagaalu Park on government-owned land administrated by the Department of Parks and Recreation. The construction was initiated after the former public boat ramps at Fagasa and Pago Pago were damaged from the 2009 tsunami. The park is used for recreational activities such as picnicking, swimming, fishing, and camping.

On Tutuila Island, the majority of sea turtle sightings take place in Fagaalu Park, Lion's Park in Tafuna, and Gataivai (in Pago Pago Harbor).

Demographics

As of the early 1980s, 21 percent of Fagaalu residents were born abroad. By 1990, 42 percent of residents were born outside of American Samoa. As of the 1990 U.S. Census, the village was home to 153 houses. Historically, residential development has taken place along the south and north sides of Fagaalu Stream. Another residential area is found upland of Fagaalu Park along the shoreline road and adjoining steeper slopes.

Notable residents 
Elama Faatonu – Olympic sprinter for the American Samoa 
Anthony Liu – Olympic judoka
Leonard Peters – former football safety and current rugby union player
Junior Sifa – American rugby union player
Kaino Thomsen-Fuataga – Samoan Olympic taekwondo practitioner
Nathaniel Tuamoheloa – Olympic wrestler for ASA
Ching Maou Wei – Olympic swimmer
Jerome Kaino – New Zealand rugby union player (born in Fagaalu; raised in Auckland, New Zealand)
A. U. Fuimaono – politician

References

Villages in American Samoa